Zhiyan (602–668) was a Chinese Buddhist monk who is considered the second patriarch of the Chinese Buddhist Huayan school. Zhiyan was born in the second year of the reign of Emperor Wen of Sui. He was a devotee of the Avatamsaka Sutra and was critical of the philosophy of Xuanzang. Zhiyan lectured on the Avatamsaka Sutra at Yunhua Temple and was a teacher to the influential Huayan patriarch Fazang. He passed away at Qingjing Temple in the first year of Emperor Zhaozong of Tang.

Further reading
 Gimello, Robert M. (1976). "Chih-Yen, (602-668) and the foundations of Huayan Buddhism", Dissertation: Columbia University

602 births
668 deaths
Huayan Buddhists